Lt. Col. Stephen Moulton and his sons fought in one of the most pivotal battles of the American Revolutionary War.

Fighting a rear guard action for three days as George Washington directed the American retreat from Long Island, Moulton and three of his sons were finally captured on September 15, 1775.  Moulton and his sons, all officers, were detained as prisoners of war by General Howe’s Adjutant in the notorious Sugar House Prison in New York City. After being held for five months by General Howe's forces, Moulton and his sons were exchanged for British officers held by General Washington's staff in March 1777.

Further reading
Lt. Colonel Moulton's service is chronicled in the official history of Floyd, New York and documented on page 88 of the New York Revolutionary War Census of Pensioners for Revolutionary Military Services, published in 1841 in Washington, DC. (195p).

References

Year of birth missing
Year of death missing
Continental Army officers from New York (state)
American Revolutionary War prisoners of war held by Great Britain